Chachai Falls is in Rewa district in the Indian state of Madhya Pradesh. It is the 23rd highest waterfall in India.

The Falls
The Chachai Falls is on the Beehad River, a tributary of Tamsa or Tons River as it comes down from the Rewa Plateau.

Chachai Falls is an example of a nick point caused by rejuvenation. Knick point, also called a nick point or simply nick, represents breaks in slopes in the longitudinal profile of a river caused by rejuvenation. The break in channel gradient allows water to fall vertically giving rise to a waterfall.

Location

See also
List of waterfalls in India
List of waterfalls in India by height

References 

Waterfalls of Madhya Pradesh
Tourist attractions in Rewa district